Castle Meads Power Station was a coal-fired power station situated on Alney Island in the River Severn at Gloucester.

History
Construction of the station began in 1940, and it was opened in December 1942. It was built to replace the electricity supply from Gloucester Corporation's works on Commercial Road. Castle Meads was one of two 'war emergency' stations intended to spread the risk due to war damage. The other station was at Earley near Reading. Castle Meads comprised two 20 MW British Thomson-Houston turbo-alternator sets, the first was commissioned in December 1942 just two years after work started on the site. These were powered by steam from five Yarrow boilers each producing 100,000 pounds per hour (12.6 kg/s) of steam at 425 psi and 825 °F (29.3 bar and 441 °C). There was also a 75 kW diesel engine set. When the electricity industry was nationalised in 1948 and the passed to the British Electricity Authority and later the Central Electricity Generating Board.

Coal brought to the station by rail on the Great Western Railway's Docks branch from Over, and by barge. Once at the station, coal was transported toward the boilers by a fireless locomotive, one of only 162 ever built in Britain. It was built by Andrew Barclays of Kilmarnock in 1942, carrying the works number 2126. After the closure of the power station, the locomotive was preserved at the National Waterways Museum in Gloucester. The capacity and output of the station was:

The station used river water for condensing the steam and for cooling.

The station closed after 1972. The station was demolished for charity in 1978 by Gloucester Round Table.

References

Demolished power stations in the United Kingdom
Power stations in South West England
Former power stations in England
Coal-fired power stations in England
Buildings and structures in Gloucester